Alison Ann Trotter  (23 January 1932 – 14 July 2022) was a New Zealand historian. She was the first woman to be appointed pro vice-chancellor of the University of Otago.

Early life and education 
Alison Ann Trotter was born in Hāwera, New Zealand on 23 January 1932, daughter of Pan and Clement George Trotter. She was educated at Hāwera Main Primary School, before undertaking her secondary schooling at St Cuthbert's College in Auckland from 1945 to 1949, where she was head girl in her final year.

She graduated from the University of Otago with a master of arts in 1953, followed by teacher training at Auckland Training College.

Career 
Trotter taught history and social studies at Epsom Girls' Grammar School from 1959 to 1968, where she influenced Helen Clark, later prime minister of New Zealand. She left to study in England, completing a Master of Arts degree at the School of Oriental and African Studies, followed by a PhD at the London School of Economics, where her research focussed on Asian history. 

In 1973, Trotter returned to New Zealand to lecture in Asian history at the University of Otago, rising to become a full professor in 1993. She served as pro vice-chancellor at the University of Otago from 1993 to 1997, the first woman to fill this role.

Trotter was appointed an Officer of the New Zealand Order of Merit in the 1997 Queen's Birthday Honours, for services to historical research. She retired from the University of Otago in 1998, receiving the title of emeritus professor, and moved to Wellington.

Trotter died in Wellington on 14 July 2022.

Selected publications

References 

1922 births
2022 deaths
Officers of the New Zealand Order of Merit
New Zealand historians
University of Otago alumni
Academic staff of the University of Otago
People from Hāwera
People educated at St Cuthbert's College, Auckland
Alumni of the London School of Economics
New Zealand schoolteachers
Alumni of SOAS University of London